The men's floor (or "free") competition at the 1936 Summer Olympics was held at the Waldbühne on 10 and 11 August. It was the second appearance of the event, introduced in 1932.

Competition format
The gymnastics format returned to the aggregation format used in 1928 but not in 1932. Each nation entered a team of eight gymnasts (Bulgaria had only 7). All entrants in the gymnastics competitions (Frang of Luxembourg did not compete in the floor exercise) performed both a compulsory exercise and a voluntary exercise, with the scores summed to give a final total. The scores in the floor exercise were added to the other apparatus scores to give individual all-around scores; the top six individual scores on each team were summed to give a team all-around score. No separate finals were contested.

Results

References

Men's floor
1936
Men's events at the 1936 Summer Olympics